Archibald Murray (16 February 1875 – 8 April 1949) was a British fencer. He competed in the individual and team sabre events at the 1908 Summer Olympics. Murray became an OBE in 1936.

References

External links
 

1875 births
1949 deaths
British male fencers
Olympic fencers of Great Britain
Fencers at the 1908 Summer Olympics